"Timewarp / Join the Dots" is the first single from drum and bass artist Sub Focus to be released from the self-titled debut album Sub Focus. The single managed to reach number 92 on the UK Singles Chart and number seven on the UK Dance Chart.

Track listing

Chart performance

Release history

References

2008 singles
RAM Records singles
Sub Focus songs
Songs written by Sub Focus